Martina Hingis defeated Lindsay Davenport in the final, 6–3, 6–2 to win the women's singles tennis title at the 2000 Miami Open. She did not lose a set, and lost only 21 games, en route to the title.

Venus Williams was the two-time defending champion, but did not participate this year.

Seeds 
A champion seed is indicated in bold text while text in italics indicates the round in which that seed was eliminated.  All thirty-two seeds received a bye to the second round.

  Martina Hingis (champion)
  Lindsay Davenport (final)
  Mary Pierce (second round)
  Nathalie Tauziat (third round)
  Serena Williams (fourth round)
  Conchita Martínez (fourth round)
  Monica Seles (semifinals)
  Julie Halard-Decugis (second round)
  Anna Kournikova (fourth round)
  Arantxa Sánchez Vicario (third round)
  Barbara Schett (second round)
  Sandrine Testud (semifinals)
  Jennifer Capriati (quarterfinals)
  Anke Huber (third round)
  Elena Likhovtseva (fourth round)
  Dominique Van Roost (third round, withdrew)
  Ai Sugiyama (third round)
  Amanda Coetzer (quarterfinals)
  Amy Frazier (quarterfinals)
  Ruxandra Dragomir (third round)
  Nathalie Dechy (fourth round)
  Silvija Talaja (third round)
  Patty Schnyder (third round)
  Chanda Rubin (third round)
  Sabine Appelmans (fourth round)
  Lisa Raymond (third round)
  Sylvia Plischke (third round)
  Kim Clijsters (fourth round)
  Anne-Gaëlle Sidot (third round)
  Corina Morariu (second round)
  Natasha Zvereva (third round)
  Sarah Pitkowski (third round)

Draw

Finals

Top half

Section 1

Section 2

Section 3

Section 4

Bottom half

Section 5

Section 6

Section 7

Section 8

References 
 2000 Ericsson Open Draw

Women's Singles